The Scarlets are one of the four professional Welsh rugby union teams and are based in Llanelli, Wales. Their home ground is the Parc y Scarlets stadium. They play in the United Rugby Championship and the European Rugby Champions Cup (which replaced the Heineken Cup from the 2014–15 season). The club was originally named the Llanelli Scarlets but was renamed at the start of the 2008–09 rugby season.

The Llanelli Scarlets were founded in 2003, as one of the five (now four) regional teams created by the Welsh Rugby Union (WRU). The Scarlets are affiliated with a number of semi-professional and amateur clubs throughout the area, including Welsh Premier Division sides Llanelli RFC, Carmarthen Quins RFC and Llandovery RFC. Through the 2007–08 season, they played most of their games at Stradey Park in Llanelli, but they have also played matches at the Racecourse Ground in Wrexham. The club's new stadium, Parc y Scarlets, was constructed in nearby Pemberton, and opened in November 2008.

The Scarlets won the league twice: the initial 2003–04 Celtic League season, and the Pro12 in 2016–17, defeating Munster 46–22 in the 2017 Pro12 Grand Final.

History

Formation

In 2003, the WRU elected to reduce the top tier of Welsh professional rugby from nine clubs into five regions during the introduction of regional rugby union teams in Wales, attempting to mirror the successful formats in Ireland, South Africa, Australia and New Zealand.

Initially, it was planned to have a region playing at Stradey Park, with players coming from Llanelli, Swansea and Neath. This was then modified to have Llanelli and Swansea merging, while Neath joined with Bridgend. Llanelli were opposed to both plans and requested standalone status. Eventually, Llanelli and Cardiff were allowed to remain independent. The Llanelli Scarlets brand was officially launched on 7 July 2003.

Despite always having been a 100% owned Llanelli RFC subsidiary, the Scarlets were originally conceived as representing the whole of West and North Wales. In the early seasons of regional rugby, the Scarlets played a small number of games at the Racecourse Ground in Wrexham. While nominally continuing to be the regional franchisee for North Wales, the Scarlets presence there has diminished. As of 2018, the Scarlets consider their region to represent the three counties of Carmarthenshire, Ceredigion and Pembrokeshire.

2003–2014
Largely drawn from the Llanelli RFC side that won the Welsh Cup the preceding year, the Scarlets carried that success forward into their inaugural season. They reached the last eight of the 2003–04 Heineken Cup and finished the Celtic League season as champions by four points over Ulster. In the Heineken Cup, the Scarlets were drawn in Pool 4 along with Northampton Saints, Agen and Borders. The Scarlets won five of their six matches, losing only to Agen, and finished top of their pool before losing to French club Biarritz 27–10 in the quarter-finals.

The following season, however, was less successful. Plagued by injuries and retirements, as well as the departure of influential fly-half Stephen Jones to Clermont, the Scarlets finished a disappointing fifth in the league. They were even less successful in the Heineken Cup, winning just two of their six pool games to finish third behind Northampton and Toulouse. The salvation of their season came in reaching the final of the Celtic Cup, which they lost 26–17 to Munster.

The Scarlets again failed to qualify from their Heineken Cup group in 2005–06 and finished sixth in the Celtic League. They did, however, find more success in the newly restructured Anglo-Welsh Cup. After finishing at the top of their pool, they defeated Bath by one point in the semi-finals to reach the final against London Wasps at Twickenham; missing several international players, they lost 26–10. In the Heineken Cup, it was a similar story to the previous season, with the Scarlets winning two of their six fixtures to finish third in the pool again, behind Toulouse and Wasps. Despite finishing sixth in the Celtic League, the team qualified for the Heineken Cup for the 2006–07 season as the second-best-placed Welsh team in the league. They also re-signed Stephen Jones, and full-back Barry Davies extended his contract to stay with the Scarlets. The Scarlets' Director of Rugby, Gareth Jenkins, had been appointed as Wales' national team coach, having been with the region since its inception. Phil Davies, then coach of Leeds Tykes, replaced Jenkins at the Scarlets.

At the first home game of the 2006–07 season, an information sheet was handed out to supporters with details of the club's financial situation. There was opposition by local residents to plans by the Scarlets to move to a new stadium and sell their current ground for housing development. The information sheet stated that, due to delays caused by the opposition and benefactors pulling out of the club, it was "extremely unlikely that [the Llanelli Scarlets] could survive to the end of the present season unless other financial assistance is found", which would result in "the loss, probably for all time, of professional rugby in West Wales." Local residents believed, however, that the infrastructure, such as roads and schools, will not cope with 450 new houses being built on the site. On 28 November 2006, the regions secured investment from Tim Griffiths, a London-based businessman.

In the 2006–07 Heineken Cup, the Scarlets recorded one of the most famous victories in their brief history as a region, defeating Toulouse 41–34 away, despite twice trailing by 21 points. This was an unexpected victory, despite the Scarlets having won their first three games of the 2006–07 competition. They later secured their place in the Heineken Cup quarter-final with a convincing 35–11 win over Ulster at Ravenhill. The Scarlets went on to become only the fifth team in the history of the competition to win all their pool matches. They beat current holders Munster 24–15 at Stradey Park in the quarter-finals, but were beaten 33–17 in the semis by a strong Leicester Tigers side, putting an end to their hopes of making it 'third time lucky' in Heineken Cup semi-finals. On 30 April 2008, Phil Davies was controversially sacked as the Scarlets' head coach. The reasons for his departure remain unclear, but it is believed that he found out via the media before being informed by club chairman Stuart Gallacher.

The Scarlets moved from Stradey Park at the end of November 2008 to a new ground at Pemberton called Parc y Scarlets. The final Scarlets match played at Stradey Park was on 24 October 2008, against Bristol in the group stage of the Anglo-Welsh Cup. The Scarlets won 27–0 in front of a capacity crowd, which included former Llanelli captains such as Delme Thomas and Phil Bennett.

The Scarlets' first match at their new home was an 18–16 Celtic League defeat to Munster on 28 November 2008. Their first Heineken Cup match at Parc y Scarlets was held on 12 December against Ulster and finished in a 16–16 draw. Both matches were held with reduced capacity, as law requires that a new stadium hold three events at reduced capacity before it is authorised for its full capacity. The official opening ceremony was on 31 January 2009 when the Scarlets faced the Barbarians.

In 2008, head coach Phil Davies was replaced by Nigel Davies after a sixth-place finish in the Celtic League and an end of season slump. Nigel Davies departed the club in 2012, and was replaced by defence coach and longtime Scarlets player, Simon Easterby.

2014–2019: the Wayne Pivac years
In May 2014, it was confirmed that the four Welsh regions would compete in the annual Premiership Sevens Series after a three-year deal was agreed with BT Sport.

After the 2013–14 season, the Scarlets had numerous changes in coaching staff. Forwards coach Danny Wilson departed for Bristol, while Byron Hayward joined as a defense coach. Wayne Pivac was hired as an assistant coach, but selected as head coach when Simon Easterby left the position to become forwards coach with Ireland.

Under Pivac, the Scarlets' performances did not immediately turn around. Centre Jonathan Davies left for Clermont ahead of the 2014–15 season, but Hadleigh Parkes was signed from Auckland, and reunited with former coach Pivac. Mid-table finishes continued for the next two seasons. Mark Jones departed in 2015, replaced by long time Scarlets fly-half and London Wasps attack coach Stephen Jones.

Ahead of 2016, Tadhg Beirne joined the side. The Irish forward arrived from Leinster, and capable of playing at lock and in the back row, proved to be an influential player in the pack. Recruitment was further bolstered with Crusaders back Johnny McNicholl and the return of Jonathan Davies from France. Fly-half Rhys Patchell was signed from Cardiff Blues, with Steven Shingler moving in the opposite direction. The season started poorly, with the Scarlets losing their first three matches. Improvements throughout the season saw the Scarlets finish in third place in the table, qualifying for the play-offs. The Scarlets beat Leinster away at the RDS Stadium, 27–15, despite winger Steff Evans being sent off in the first half. The Scarlets beat Munster in the final with an emphatic 46–22 win. This was the Scarlets second title, their first having come in 2004 during the first Celtic League season.

The Scarlets looked to maintain their title the following season in the inaugural Pro14 tournament. Leigh Halfpenny joined from Toulon, replacing outgoing fullback Liam Williams. They topped their pool in the Champions Cup, and defeated La Rochelle 29–17 in the quarter final. The Scarlets fell short of the final, losing to eventual winners Leinster in their semi-final.

They again reached the final in the league, having defeated the Cheetahs and Glasgow Warriors in the knock-out rounds, but came up short against Leinster, losing 40–32 in the final despite a late flurry of tries and a hat-trick from Johnny McNicholl.

Wayne Pivac was announced as Warren Gatland's successor as Wales coach after the 2019 Rugby World Cup. With him left Stephen Jones and Byron Hayward, who joined Pivac on the Wales coaching staff.

Crusaders assistant coach Brad Mooar was announced as the next head coach in December 2018.

2019–present: Coaching changes
New coach Brad Mooar started the 2019 season well, winning five out of the first six matches, but left before settling in, having been selected by new All Blacks coach Ian Foster to join his staff as assistant coach. The Scarlets and the New Zealand Rugby Union agreed to a release for Mooar, and his assistant coach Glenn Delaney was named as his successor. Former Scarlets Dwayne Peel was announced as head coach for the forthcoming season, with Delaney moving to a Director of Rugby role. After a poor run of matches, Delaney was relieved of his duties as head coach and departed the club before assuming the Director of Rugby role, with Dai Flanagan stepping in as caretaker head coach.

Ahead of the 2021–22 United Rugby Championship, Leinster skills coach Hugh Hogan was brought in as defence coach. Hogan departed after one season, being replaced by Wales assistant coach Gareth Williams.

Few signings were made prior to the new season, with All Blacks utility forward Vaea Fifita the headline acquisition, while Liam Williams departed for Cardiff following his second spell with the club. Longtime prop Rob Evans followed Steffan Hughes, and former Dragon Angus O'Brien to the Dragons, along with backs coach Dai Flanagan, who was named as their new head coach.

Following their collapse in October 2022, Wasps head coach Lee Blackett joined as backs coach for the remainder of the season. The season began poorly for the Scarlets, winning only one URC match prior to the international window. Wales prop Sam Wainwright joined midseason, with Samson Lee remaining sidelined with a long-term injury. Upon regrouping, fortunes had changed, with the team winning both matches in the first two rounds of the 2022–23 EPCR Challenge Cup pool stage, putting themselves at the top of their pool. They then beat Bayonne and the Cheetahs in the return matches to finish top of the pool and set up a quarter-final against Brive.

Name and colours

The Scarlets took their name from the nickname of Llanelli RFC, their main feeder club. Llanelli have played in red since 1884 when they played a game against a touring Ireland side. This close link with Llanelli RFC has also led to the Scarlets adopting the scarlet red colour for their primary jerseys, with their secondary colours generally being blue.

The region was originally named the Llanelli Scarlets, but was renamed at the start of the 2008–09 rugby season to more accurately represent the area covered by the region.

Kit suppliers

Stadium

From 2003 to the 2007–08 season, the Scarlets played most of their home matches at Llanelli's Stradey Park (also the home of Llanelli RFC). However, they have played several games in North Wales, at Wrexham's Racecourse Ground, to promote the region's geographical representation. The last league game played at the Racecourse Ground was in September 2005. The 2006–07 season was planned to be the last season played at Stradey Park, which was subsequently to be demolished for the building of apartments. The Scarlets played every home game of the 2006–07 season at Stradey Park to commemorate the historic ground. They played their last game at Stradey Park on 24 October 2008 against Bristol, and their first game at Parc y Scarlets on 28 November 2008 against Munster.

The new home of the Scarlets and Llanelli RFC, known as Parc y Scarlets, is in Pemberton. The new stadium cost £23 million to be constructed and holds 14,340 spectators. The first game held at the stadium saw Llanelli RFC play Cardiff RFC on 15 November 2008. The stadium's main stand is located on the south side of the ground, and houses the new Scarlets museum and club shop, as well as a sports bar, the players' changing rooms and a players' gym. Outside the stadium there is a training barn for the players, as well as a training pitch and athletics track. The remainder of the site is taken up by the Parc Trostre retail park.

Current squad

Academy squad

British & Irish Lions
The following players were selected for the British & Irish Lions touring squads while contracted to the Scarlets:

2005: Simon Easterby, Dwayne Peel
2009: Stephen Jones, Matthew Rees
2013: Jonathan Davies, George North
2017: Jonathan Davies, Ken Owens, Liam Williams
2021: Gareth Davies, Wyn Jones, Ken Owens, Liam Williams

Stephen Jones was also selected for the 2005 Lions tour whilst playing for Clermont Auvergne. Former Scarlets Scott Quinnell, Robin McBryde and Dafydd James were also selected for the Lions on the 2001 tour to Australia while playing for Llanelli RFC.

Notable former players
Players who have won over 20 international caps and have played for the Scarlets:

 Josh Adams
 Jake Ball
 Lee Byrne
 Aled Davies
 John Davies
 Leigh Davies
 Rob Evans
 Dafydd James
 Dafydd Jones
 Mark Jones
 Rhodri Jones
 Stephen Jones
 Robin McBryde
 George North
 Hadleigh Parkes
 Dwayne Peel
 Mike Phillips
 Alix Popham
 Andy Powell
 Rhys Priestland
 Matthew Rees
 Scott Quinnell
 Mark Taylor
 Gavin Thomas
 Iestyn Thomas
 Liam Williams
 Chris Wyatt
 David Lyons
 Jon Thiel
 D. T. H. van der Merwe
 Olly Barkley
 Ben Morgan
 Tadhg Beirne
 Guy Easterby
 Simon Easterby
 Dave Hewett
 Kees Meeuws
 Horațiu Pungea
 Mahonri Schwalger
 John Barclay
 Bruce Douglas
 Sean Lamont
 Scott Macleod
 Herschel Jantjies
 Inoke Afeaki
 Viliame Iongi
 Sililo Martens
 Mike Hercus
 Dave Hodges

Coaching staff

Head coaches

Current backroom staff

Results and statistics

Seasons

 2003–04 Llanelli Scarlets season
 2004–05 Llanelli Scarlets season
 2005–06 Llanelli Scarlets season
 2006–07 Llanelli Scarlets season
 2007–08 Llanelli Scarlets season
 2008–09 Scarlets season
 2009–10 Scarlets season
 2010–11 Scarlets season
 2011–12 Scarlets season
 2012–13 Scarlets season
 2013–14 Scarlets season
 2014–15 Scarlets season
 2015–16 Scarlets season
 2016–17 Scarlets season
 2017–18 Scarlets season
 2018–19 Scarlets season
 2019–20 Scarlets season
 2020–21 Scarlets season
 2021–22 Scarlets season
 2022–23 Scarlets season

Celtic League / Pro12 / Pro14 / United Rugby Championship

Celtic Cup

Heineken Cup / European Champions Cup

European Challenge Cup

Anglo-Welsh Cup

Honours
Celtic League/Pro12/Pro14:
Winners: 2 (2003–04), (2016–17)
Runners-up: 1 (2017–18)
United Rugby Championship Welsh Shield
Runners-up: 1 (2021–22)
Celtic Cup
Runners-up: 1 (2004–05)
Anglo-Welsh Cup
Runners-up: 1 (2005–06)

ERC Elite Awards
For the 10th anniversary season of the Heineken Cup, ERC, the tournament organisers, introduced the ERC Elite Awards scheme to recognise and reward the players and teams who have made outstanding contributions to the tournament. The Scarlets were awarded the ERC team award for playing 50 games, and Robin McBryde, John Davies, Dafydd James and Iestyn Thomas were recognised for having made 50 appearances in the competition.

See also
Llanelli RFC
Scarlet FM

References

External links

Scarlets official site 
Scarlets  on WRU.co.uk
Scarlets on BBC.co.uk
Scarlets Forum

 
Welsh rugby union teams
United Rugby Championship teams
Rugby clubs established in 2003
Sport in Llanelli
2003 establishments in Wales